The Farmers and Mechanics Building is a historic "skyscraper" located in West Chester, Chester County, Pennsylvania. It was completed in 1908 and is a six-story skyscraper building, with a basement and penthouse in the Classical Revival style.  The top floor once featured a Roof Garden.  The exterior is faced in Indiana limestone and yellow hard face brick, with terra cotta decorative details. In 1918 when the Boy Scouts were founded in Chester County the Farmers and Mechanics Building became their headquarters.  

It was added to the National Register of Historic Places in 1983.  It is located in the West Chester Downtown Historic District.

References

West Chester, Pennsylvania
Commercial buildings on the National Register of Historic Places in Pennsylvania
Commercial buildings completed in 1908
Neoclassical architecture in Pennsylvania
Buildings and structures in Chester County, Pennsylvania
National Register of Historic Places in Chester County, Pennsylvania
1908 establishments in Pennsylvania
Individually listed contributing properties to historic districts on the National Register in Pennsylvania